Konstantin Krause (born 8 October 1967, in Bad Langensalza) is a retired German long jumper.

He won the silver medal at the 1992 European Indoor Championships. He represented the sports clubs TV Wattenscheid, TV Heppenheim and LG Ohra/Hörsel, and became German champion in 1998 and 1999.

His personal best jump is 8.27 metres, achieved in June 1997 in Bad Langensalza. This ranks him fifth among German long jumpers, behind Lutz Dombrowski, Frank Paschek, Josef Schwarz and Henry Lauterbach and equal to Marco Delonge.

References

1967 births
Living people
People from Bad Langensalza
German male long jumpers
Athletes (track and field) at the 1992 Summer Olympics
Olympic athletes of Germany
Sportspeople from Thuringia